Water Mill at Opwetten (F48) is an oil painting of the Watermill at Opwetten, created in 1884 by Vincent van Gogh. It is considered one of his first works using oil paint as a medium and anticipates Van Gogh's early realist masterpiece, The Potato Eaters.

Van Gogh described the process of painting this piece to his brother Theo van Gogh in May 1884, writing

See also
 List of works by Vincent van Gogh

External links

References 

Paintings by Vincent van Gogh
1884 paintings
Water in art